Isaac Eyre (6 January 1875–1947) was an English footballer who played in the Football League for Sheffield Wednesday. His only appearance for Wednesday came in a 1–0 victory away against Stoke on 12 March 1904.

References

1875 births
1947 deaths
English footballers
Association football forwards
English Football League players
Sheffield F.C. players
Sheffield Wednesday F.C. players